Julen Goikoetxea Garate (18 August 1985 – 7 October 2006) was a Basque racing cyclist from Ondarroa.

Goikoetxea started his international career in 2004 as a member of the Alfus Tedes Garbialdi team. In his first two seasons he won five races. UCI ProTour team  acknowledged his talent and contracted him for the 2007 season. Despite his success as a cyclist, he began to suffer from depression. He tried to kill himself several times before doctors took care of his health. As a result, he did not cycle any races since May 2006. On 7 October 2006 he committed suicide by jumping off his balcony.

Major results

2004
 1st Bergara
2005
 1st Ereño
 1st Antzuola
 1st Elgoibar
 1st Zegama

References

External links 
Profile at ciclismoenred.com

1985 births
2006 deaths
Spanish male cyclists
Suicides by jumping in Spain
Sportspeople from Biscay
Cyclists from the Basque Country (autonomous community)
People from Ondarroa
2006 suicides